Marco Elias Gonzales (born February 16, 1992) is an American professional baseball pitcher for the Seattle Mariners of Major League Baseball (MLB). He has previously played in MLB for the St. Louis Cardinals. He attended Gonzaga University, where he played college baseball for the Gonzaga Bulldogs as a pitcher and first baseman.

At Gonzaga, Gonzales won the West Coast Conference Player of the Year, Pitcher of the Year, and Freshman of the Year awards.  Gonzales also was chosen as an All-American and named the John Olerud Award winner for 2013. The Cardinals selected him with the 19th overall pick in the first round of the June 2013 MLB draft. In Minor League Baseball in 2014, he was a Texas League midseason All-Star and Pitcher of the Week selection and the Cardinals' Minor League Pitcher of the Year. He made his MLB debut in 2014, and underwent Tommy John surgery in 2016 for a torn ulnar collateral ligament in his left elbow. The Cardinals traded him to the Mariners in 2017.

Amateur career
Gonzales attended Rocky Mountain High School in Fort Collins, Colorado. He lettered in baseball in all four years. In his sophomore, junior, and senior seasons, he was named All-Colorado and All-Front Range.  As a senior, he was named the Colorado High School Baseball Player of the Year after compiling an 11–0 won–loss record (W–L) with a 2.20 earned run average (ERA) and 87 strikeouts (SO) in 54 innings pitched (IP).  He also batted .486 with seven home runs and 36 runs batted in (RBI).  He started the Class 5A state championship game for Rocky Mountain in all four years of his high school career, winning all four.

The Colorado Rockies selected Gonzales in the 29th round of the 2010 Major League Baseball (MLB) draft.  As the Rockies did not make a significant offer and advised him to attend college, Gonzales opted not to sign.  Instead, he enrolled at Gonzaga University to play college baseball for the Bulldogs.  That summer, he played collegiate summer baseball for the Saskatoon Yellow Jackets of the Western Canadian Baseball league, and the Wenatchee AppleSox of the West Coast League after the WMBL season was over.

As a freshman at Gonzaga, Gonzales finished with an 11–2 W–L and 2.57 ERA, and was named West Coast Conference (WCC) co-Player of the Year and co-Freshman of the Year, along with Kris Bryant.  As a sophomore, he had an 8–2 W–L and a 1.55 ERA, and was named WCC Pitcher of the Year and an All-American.  That summer, he briefly played collegiate summer baseball with the Falmouth Commodores of the Cape Cod Baseball League, and played for the United States national collegiate baseball team in tournaments in Cuba and the Netherlands, being named most valuable player of the Netherlands tournament.

In 2013, his junior year, he pitched a 7–3 record with a 2.80 ERA, and led the team in hitting with a .311 average, two home runs and 26 RBI, earning him Co-West Coast Conference Player of the Year honors. Gonzales was named a semifinalist for the Golden Spikes Award.  In 2013, he won the John Olerud Award, awarded annually by the College Baseball Foundation to the best two-way player of the season.

Professional career

Minor leagues
Gonzales was widely considered to be a first-round pick before the 2013 MLB draft.  The St. Louis Cardinals selected him 19th overall.  He signed on June 19 for $1.85 million.  Baseball America rated him #28 in their Top 500 prospects.

The Cardinals assigned him to the Gulf Coast League Cardinals in the rookie-level Gulf Coast League, then promoted him to the Palm Beach Cardinals of the Class A-Advanced Florida State League.  He completed  IP with a 2.70 ERA between the two squads.  In addition, he allowed 18 hits and eight walks for a 1.114 walks plus hits per inning pitched ratio (WHIP) while striking out 23.

Gonzales began the 2014 season with Palm Beach, and received a promotion to the Springfield Cardinals of the Class AA Texas League in May.  His statistics after seven starts at Springfield included  IP, a 3–2 won-loss record, a 2.33 ERA.  He allowed 33 hits, two home runs, and 10 walks while striking out 46.  He was rated the #4 prospect in the Cardinals' organization.  The Cardinals called him up to the major leagues, and, the day before he made his MLB debut, he was named to the 2014 All-Star Futures Game at Target Field in Minneapolis, Minnesota.

St Louis Cardinals

2014
Filling in for the injured Jaime García, Gonzales made his major league debut as the starter against the Rockies on June 25.  Due to his promotion to the major leagues, he was removed from the Futures Game roster.  He doubled in his first major league at-bat.  Left fielder and former Rockie Matt Holliday singled him home to score his first run.  On the mound, he gave up five earned runs and seven hits, with one home run in five innings, walking two, striking out three, facing 24 batters, and received a no-decision.  Gonzales began with three scoreless innings, but got into trouble in the fourth by giving up a lead-off home run to Drew Stubbs, two doubles and two singles.  The Cardinals eventually won, 9–6. Gonzales became the first Cardinals' starter to make his debut without playing at the Triple A level since Cliff Politte in April 1998.

Gonzales' second MLB start came against the San Francisco Giants at AT&T Park.  The outing went similar to his first MLB appearance, he started with three scoreless innings but yielded multiple runs in the fourth.  In  IP, he yielded five earned runs, seven hits, four walks and two strikeouts.  The Giants won 5–0, giving him his first MLB loss.  After posting a 7.07 ERA in first three MLB starts, the Cardinals optioned him to the Triple-A Memphis Redbirds on July 7, where he appeared for the first time.

On August 30, the Cardinals recalled Gonzales, and he gained his first MLB win in a 13–2 romp over the Chicago Cubs.  He completed six innings, allowed one run on three hits, two walks, and struck out five.  Gonzales' third win of the season came against the Rockies by a score of 4–1 on September 14 as he struck out nine in  IP.  The nine strikeouts were the most by a Cardinals left-handed rookie since Rick Ankiel on September 13, 2000.  He made 10 total MLB appearances, five as a starter, completing  IP, allowing 32 H, 21 BB, 16 ER and a 4.15 ERA with a 4–2 W–L.  In 31 total games – including 26 starts – between three minor league levels and the major leagues, Gonzales allowed a 2.81 ERA with a 13–7 W–L record and 148 SO in  IP.

The Cardinals made the playoffs in 2014, and Gonzales made his MLB postseason debut, pitching in relief.  He recorded three total scoreless innings in the National League Division Series (NLDS) against the Los Angeles Dodgers.  He picked up two of the club's three wins, including the series clincher.  He pitched another three innings against the Giants in the National League Championship Series (NLCS), giving up three earned runs as the Cardinals were eliminated from the postseason.  In December, the Cardinals named him their Minor League Pitcher of the Year.

2015
Having struggled with a shoulder injury for much of the 2015 season, Gonzales totaled 13 starts and 64 innings with Memphis, allowing a 5.20 ERA with 81 hits and a .315 batting average against.  His record was 1–4.  The Cardinals activated him with the roster expansion on September 1.  He made his first major league appearance and start of the season against the Washington Nationals that day, allowing four runs in less than three innings.  Prior to the 2016 season, Baseball America ranked him as the fifth-best prospect in the Cardinals' system.

2016
He was sidelined on April 13, 2016, after a diagnosis on a torn ulnar collateral ligament in his left elbow. The injury required Tommy John surgery in April 2016, putting Gonzales out for the entire 2016 season. He was ranked the seventh-best prospect in the Cardinals' organization.

2017
Gonzales was recalled on June 13, 2017, to start Game 2 of a doubleheader against the Milwaukee Brewers. It was his first start in the majors since September 1, 2015.

Seattle Mariners

2017 
On July 21, 2017, the Cardinals traded Gonzales to the Seattle Mariners for Tyler O'Neill. Gonzales made his Mariners debut on August 6, 2017 against the Kansas City Royals, in which he went 4 innings, allowing 5 earned runs on 7 hits, a walk, and 5 strikeouts. In 2017 with the Mariners, he made 7 starts (10 appearances total), going 1–1 with a 5.40 ERA (22 earned runs) and 4.28 FIP with 30 strikeouts and 11 walks.

2018
After pitching to a 1–1 record and 2.08 ERA in seven spring training starts, Gonzales was rewarded a spot on the Mariners' 2018 Opening Day roster and was slotted 4th in their starting rotation. On June 29, he threw his first career complete game against the Kansas City Royals, limiting them to just 1 run on 6 hits, 7 strikeouts, and no walks. Gonzales finished the first half of the season with a 10–5 record and 3.41 ERA in 19 starts (113.1 IP). However, he faltered down the stretch, posting a 3–4 record with 5.23 ERA in 10 starts (53.1 IP). Nonetheless, Gonzales managed to stay healthy in his first full season in Seattle, starting a career-high 29 games, leading the team in wins with 13 while striking out 145 batters and compiling a 4.00 ERA and 3.43 FIP over 166.2 innings pitched.

2019
On March 9, 2019, Gonzales was named the Mariners' Opening Day starter for their opening series in Japan. It also marked the first year that Félix Hernández would not be the Mariners' Opening Day starter in 10 years. In his first ever Opening Day start against the Oakland Athletics on March 20 in Tokyo, Japan, Gonzales earned his first win of the season by throwing 6 innings and allowing 4 runs (3 of which were earned) on 7 hits, 1 walk, and 4 strikeouts. Gonzales was the only consistent Seattle starter in the 2019 season, as he was 16–13 with a 3.99 ERA in 34 starts. In 203 innings, he struck out 147 batters and walked 56.

2020
In the pandemic-shortened 2020 season, Gonzales was named the Mariners' Opening Day starter for the second season in a row. On July 23, Gonzales started his first game of the season pitching 4.1 innings and giving up 3 earned runs on 73 pitches against the defending AL pennant winners the Houston Astros. Gonzales's first start would be the shortest outing of his season as he would go on to pitch at least 5 innings per start for the remainder of the season. The 2020 season also included Gonzales's second-ever complete game when he pitched 9 innings, giving up 1 run and striking out 8 batters while throwing 102 pitches against the Los Angeles Angels of Anaheim on August 31.

Gonzales would finish the 2020 season compiling a record of 7-2 and a 3.10 ERA in 11 starts, which would mark a personal best for ERA in a season. In the 60-game season, Gonzales would finish in the top 5 for wins and WHIP, and in the top 20 for ERA and opponent batting average in all of baseball for the first time in his career. He led the AL in walks per nine innings (0.904) and strikeout-to-walk ratio (9.143).

2021
For the 2021 season, Gonzales was named the club's Opening Day starter for the third season in a row. He started 25 games for the year, going 10-6 with a 3.96 ERA and 108 strikeouts over 143.1 innings.

2022
In 2022, he was 10-15 with a 4.15 ERA in 183 innings, in which he struck out 103 batters, as he led the league in losses and was third in home runs allowed (30). His strikeout percentage of 13.2% was the lowest among qualified pitchers in major league baseball.

Awards

Pitching profile
He features a changeup that was regarded as one of the best in his draft class. His command is above average, and throws two different breaking pitches with his curve being better than his slider. After his first MLB stint from June–July 2014, manager Mike Matheny advised him to add a curveball and cut fastball to keep hitters from focusing on his four-seam fastball and changeup.

Personal life
Gonzales' father, Frank, played baseball at La Junta High School in La Junta, Colorado, leading it to a state championship in the 1980s. He went on to pitch at Colorado State University and was drafted in the 16th round by the Detroit Tigers in 1989. He then played about ten years in the minor leagues, coached high school, and continued as a pitching coach for the Colorado Rockies’ Class A minor-league club, before being named Head Coach of the independent Pioneer League club Northern Colorado Owlz in 2023. Gonzales' mother, Gina, is a firefighter; his brother Alex also plays baseball for Gonzales' alma mater, Rocky Mountain High School. Gonzales grew up a Colorado Rockies fan.

Gonzales and his wife, Monica, married in 2015. They welcomed their first child, a daughter, in June 2021. They live in Seattle year-round.

His ancestry is a mixture of Mexican, Spanish, Italian and Native American.

See also

 St. Louis Cardinals all-time roster

References

External links

1992 births
Living people
Sportspeople from Fort Collins, Colorado
Baseball players from Colorado
Major League Baseball pitchers
St. Louis Cardinals players
Seattle Mariners players
Gonzaga Bulldogs baseball players
Gulf Coast Cardinals players
Palm Beach Cardinals players
Springfield Cardinals players
Memphis Redbirds players
Tacoma Rainiers players
Falmouth Commodores players